The Eastern Illinois Panthers baseball team is a varsity intercollegiate athletic team of Eastern Illinois University in 
Charleston, Illinois, United States. The team is a member of the Ohio Valley Conference, which is part of the National Collegiate Athletic Association's Division I. Eastern Illinois’ first baseball team was fielded in 1904. The team plays its home games at Coaches Stadium at Monier Field in Charleston, Illinois. The Panthers are coached by Jason Anderson.

Head coaches

Season Results

Retired Numbers

Notable former players
 Tim Bogar, retired Major League Baseball infielder 
Zach Borenstein, professional baseball player
Randy Myers, former American Major League Baseball pitcher with the New York Mets, Cincinnati Reds, San Diego Padres, Chicago Cubs, Baltimore Orioles and the Toronto Blue Jays between 1985 and 1998. 4x MLB All-Star.
 Marty Pattin, MLB All-Star pitcher 
 Stan Royer, MLB baseball player for the St. Louis Cardinals and Boston Red Sox 
 Kevin Seitzer, retired all-star Major League Baseball player

See also
NCAA Division II baseball tournament

References

External links